Nissan Island (also Green Island or Sir Charles Hardy Island) is the largest of the Green Islands of Papua New Guinea. The island is administered under Nissan Rural LLG in the Autonomous Region of Bougainville.

History

British and American whaling vessels visited the island in the nineteenth century for food, water and wood. The first on record was the Addison in 1837, and the last was Palmetto in 1881.

During World War II, in the Battle of the Green Islands, US and New Zealand troops recaptured several islands from heavily outnumbered Imperial Japanese forces. The New Zealand 3rd Division landed on Nissan Island on 15 February 1944 as part of the Solomon Islands campaign to isolate the Japanese stronghold at Rabaul. Shortly after the landings two airfields were constructed on the island. Richard Nixon was a supply officer on the base, and is remembered as being popular with the indigenous inhabitants. There was also a PT boat base on another island nearby. There were approximately  allied troops on the island at that time. Much of the indigenous population was removed to Guadalcanal for about seven to nine months. After that time the front line had moved closer to Japan and the island was no longer needed in the war effort.

See also
Nissan Rural LLG

References

Islands of Papua New Guinea
Geography of the Autonomous Region of Bougainville
Solomon Islands (archipelago)